Litefeet, also referred to as "getting lite," is a type of street dance/vernacular dance that emerged from Harlem, New York in the early 2000s (was established in 2006) .

The term comes from dancers dancing as though they have "light feet," or are weightless.

The Harlem shake is commonly incorporated into the social dance Litefeet, as is the "Chicken Noodle Soup, the Tone Wop (often mistakenly named the "Toe Whop"), the Rev Up and the Aunt Jackie. Moves often include: shuffling, hat tricks, and shoe tricks.

Dancers often perform on subways in New York City, where the performances are called Showtime, and at Union Square. The dance has been embraced as a symbol of the urban musical social scene of Harlem.

Well-known teams include: W.A.F.F.L.E. (We Are Family For Life, Ent.), MonzterInc, Brotherhood, 2Real Boyz, Team Rocket, Demon, 2crafty, Loonatics, Live Zombies, LyveTyme, NewMem The Litefeet Collective and Bwreckfast Club E.A.T.

Litefeet is also the name of the music played along with the dance, often fast-paced 100-110BPM rap beats and drum kits. HANN, M-Lyve, Kid the Wiz, Dsparkz, Fliqht, BSNYEA, Faro, AG the Voice of Harlem, Lil Sns, Lady MoSoFou, DJ Webstar, and Young B are some well-known Litefeet music producers.

References

External links
 "SOUND OF THE UNDERGROUND: How New York's Litefeet Producers Are Making Sure It's Showtime In The City". Vice NOISEY. August 27, 2015.
 "Litefeet", a Mini-Documentary About the Recent Criminalized Art of Subway Dancing in New York City. Viewing NYC. January 2, 2015. 
 Video: "Getting Lite under New York City." 
 Video: Making Waves on the Track: Lite Feet in NYC. Fuse TV.
 Video: Dancers perform on New York's subway despite arrest threat BBC News.

Dance in New York City
Hip hop dance
Street dance